is a Japanese football player. He plays for ReinMeer Aomori FC.

Playing career
Mizuki played for Fujieda MYFC in 2014 season. In 2015, he moved to Azul Claro Numazu.

Club statistics
Updated to 20 February 2017.

References

External links

Profile at Azul Claro Numazu

1991 births
Living people
Ryutsu Keizai University alumni
Association football people from Kanagawa Prefecture
Japanese footballers
J3 League players
Japan Football League players
Fujieda MYFC players
Azul Claro Numazu players
ReinMeer Aomori players
Association football midfielders